Road Dogs is a studio album by The Charlie Daniels Band.  It was released on May 30, 2000 courtesy of Blue Hat Records. All but two of the songs on the album were written by Charlie Daniels.

Track listing

Personnel
Charlie Daniels - Guitar, vocals
"Taz" DiGregorio - Keyboards, vocals
Charlie Hayward - Bass
Chris Wormer - Guitar, string arrangements, vocals, background vocals
David Angell - Violin
John Catchings - Cello
Carolyn Corlew - Background vocals
David Davidson - Violin
Pat McDonald - Drums, percussion
Kathryn Plummer - Viola

Critical reception

Road Dogs received four stars out of five from Allmusic. Reviewer Michael B. Smith concludes that "This is one old dog [Charlie Daniels] who isn't even considering curling up on the porch and letting life pass him by. He's rockin', but it's not in a rocking chair, it's behind a Gibson guitar."

References

2000 albums
Charlie Daniels albums